String Quintet No. 2 may refer to:

 String Quintet No. 2 (Brahms)
 String Quintet No. 2 (Dvořák)
 String Quintet No. 2 (Mendelssohn)
 String Quintet No. 2 (Mozart)